The 46th Yasar Dogu Tournament 2018, was a wrestling event held in Istanbul, Turkey between the 27 and 29 July 2018.

This international tournament includes competition in both men's and women's freestyle wrestling. This ranking tourment was held in honor of the two time Olympic Champion, Yaşar Doğu.

Wrestling champs square off in Istanbul tournament. Some 300 freestyle wrestlers from 25 countries descended on Istanbul on Friday for a three-day international tournament. The 46th edition of the Yaşar Doğu International Wrestling Tournament, named after the legendary Turkish wrestler, kicked off at Hasan Doğan Sports Hall.

Medal table

Team ranking

Medal overview

Men's freestyle

Women's freestyle

Participating nations
237 competitors from 25 nations participated.

 (22)
 (21)
 (4)
 (1)
 (5)
 (1)
 (26)
 (11)
 (6)
 (1)
 (27)
 (1)
 (1)
 (2)
 (1)
 (1)
 (1)
 (2)
 (1)
 (1)
 (2)
 (6)
 (53)
 (30)
 (10)

Ranking Series
Ranking Series Calendar 2018:
 1st Ranking Series: 25–26 January, Iran, Mahshahr  ⇒ 2018 Takhti Cup (GR)
 2nd Ranking Series: 26–28 January, Russia, Krasnoyarsk ⇒ Golden Grand Prix Ivan Yarygin 2018 (FS)
 3rd Ranking Series: 15-23 February, Cuba, La Havana ⇒ 2018  Granma y Cerro Pelado (FS, WW, GR)  
 4th Ranking Series: 16-18 February, Sweden, Klippan ⇒ Klippan Lady Open (2018) (WW) 
 5th Ranking Series: 9-10 June, Mongolia, Ulaanbaatar ⇒ 2018 Mongolia Open (FS, WW)
 6th Ranking Series: 22-23 June, China, Taiyuan ⇒ 2018 China Open (WW)
 7th Ranking Series: 23-24 June, Hungary, Győr ⇒ 2018 Hungarian Grand Prix (GR)
 8th Ranking Series: 3-5 July, Georgia, Tbilisi ⇒  2018 Tbilisi Grand Prix of V. Balavadze and G. Kartozia (FS, GR)
 9th Ranking Series: 20-22 July, Turkey, Istanbul ⇒  2018 Vehbi Emre & Hamit Kaplan Tournament (GR)
 10th Ranking Series: 27-20 July, Turkey, Istanbul ⇒  2018 Yasar Dogu Tournament (FS, WW)
 11th Ranking Series: 7-9 September, Poland, Warsaw  ⇒  Ziolkowski, Pytlasinski, Poland Open (FS, WW, GR)
 12th Ranking Series: 14-16 September, Belarus, Minsk  ⇒  Medved (Test Event Minsk 2019)

See also
2018 Vehbi Emre & Hamit Kaplan Tournament
2018 Dan Kolov & Nikola Petrov Tournament
Golden Grand Prix Ivan Yarygin 2018
2018 Grand Prix Zagreb Open
Klippan Lady Open (2018)

References 

Yasar Dogu 2018
2018 in sport wrestling
Sports competitions in Istanbul
Yaşar Doğu Tournament
International wrestling competitions hosted by Turkey